St. Teresa's National Secondary School is an all-girls secondary school in Kuching, the capital of the East Malaysian state of Sarawak. It was founded in 1885. The school is a mission school partially owned by the government.

Location 
The school is located opposite St. Joseph's National Secondary School, which is an all-boys school. Situated at Jalan Tun Abang Haji Openg, the school comprises five buildings altogether. The convent block, built in 1925, holds St. Teresa's Secondary School's Administrative office.

The school is divided into two sessions, morning session (upper secondary students of Form 3, Form 4 and Form 5) and afternoon session (lower secondary students of Form 1 - Form 2)

The school founder was Sister Teresa Cheetham.

It is a tradition in SMK St Teresa to hold a biennial Food and Fun Fair for fund-raising purposes to improve the school's surrounding and to add facilities. Today, the school has approximately 1300 girls with 74 teachers. The school has 35 classes with each form comprising 7 classes. There are 3 science stream and 4 arts stream classes for Form 4 and Form 5.

History

St. Teresa's School was named by Reverend Father Jackson MHM in honour of a Carmelite sister. He arrived in Borneo in 1881 upon the invitation of Rajah Charles Brooke to establish Catholic mission schools in Kuching and Kanowit. The name chosen for the convent and school was in fulfillment of a promise made years prior by Rev. Father Jackson. While still a student, he found great difficulty in mastering Philosophy and Theology. In his distress he appealed to the great Saint Teresa of Avila to intercede for him and promised he would do something in her honour, if his wish was granted.

St. Teresa was born in Avila, Spain, in 1515 and died in 1582. She came from a noble family with high moral values. However, she gave up all her material possessions and became a Carmelite nun in 1536. Because of her great wisdom, intelligence, humility, diligence and integrity she was declared a Doctor of the Church in September 1880. Since its foundation in 1885, the school has been entrusted under her patronage and protection, and therefore it is expected that the students of St. Teresa's School emulate and uphold her qualities and virtues.

St. Teresa's School in Kuching, Sarawak, Malaysia, had its beginnings in a small shop, at 149 Yorkshire Street, Rockdale, in England. The shop was kept by Alice Ingham and her widowed stepmother.

Ingham and a small group of friends conducted religious classes for children; they nursed the sick; they assisted with parish work. After a few years of this, Ingham was asked by Bishop Herbert Vaughan to undertake the management of domestic affairs at a newly founded missionary college in Mill Hill, near London. This meant that she was to be in charge of household toil- cooking, cleaning and pressing linen with heavy charcoal irons until 2 in the morning with four sisters. They no longer taught, nursed nor earned money for their many charities.

In 1883, the Congregation of St. Joseph's Missionary Sisters of the Sacred Heart was officially formed. Some of its members grouped in communities outside the college, but Mill Hill was where Mother Francis (Alice Ingham) lived. Mill Hill was the Congregation's centre of gravity- it was also the link between Sarawak and Rochdale.

A political exception in its day, Sarawak in the late 19th century was an oriental principality founded by Sir James Brooke in 1841, who expanded the boundaries of Sarawak, until his death in 1868, leaving a sizable amount of land to his nephew, Charles Brooke.

Rajah Charles Brooke had been in his uncle's service throughout his adult life. Rajah Charles disliked European commercial influence of the money-grabbing kind. The Borneo Company was the only foreign firm allowed to operate in Sarawak for a long time. He believed that unchecked western influence was sure to exploit and spoil the natives of Sarawak, and included the Christian missionaries in his suspicions, remarking once that Bishops are a bit of a nuisance out here and the missions do not benefit the Dayaks.

The Rajah expected the missionaries to settle the Dayaks; to transform them into law-abiding citizens of the sturdy gentlemen type. When Rajah Charles mentioned the Dayaks, he usually meant the Ibans, Sarawak's largest tribal group, and the one he understood and loved the most.

And so, when a letter came to him from the Bishop Vaughan requesting permission to set up a Catholic Mission in Sarawak, he wrote back: "... the Sarawak Government will have no objection to there being a Catholic Mission. I would recommend that your missionaries, on their arrival, to a district of Dayaks who have been almost untouched by teachings of any sort. This district would not be far from the capital, in which almost everything in the way of clothes, etc. can be obtained..."

Principals
Sister Theresa Cheetham (1885–1902)
Sister Sebastian Leitner (1902–1924)
Sister Bernadine O'Driscoll (1924–1938)
Rev. Mother Joseph Connaughton (1924–1938)
Sister Judith Egan (1968–1971)
Mrs. Thankam Paul (1971)
Sister Sylvia Cheong (1972–1982, 1987–1992)
Mrs. Molly Chong (1982–1987)
Mrs. Anna Dreba (1992-September 1997)
Christopher Tan (1997–2005)
Christopher Su Hiong Ai (2005–2006)
Mary John (2006–present)
source:

School management
The School's Board Of Management
PIBG (Persatuan Ibu Bapa dan Guru) / PTA (Parent Teacher Association)
OTA (Old Teresians' Association)

Sports houses
Every year, Sports Day is held during the early part of the year. Students are divided into different houses (usually when they first enrolled into the school, without any specific classifications; students are not allowed to switch between houses) and compete with each other to earn the title of "Best Sports House of The Year". Each house has different colours. These houses include
Cheetham (Green)
Leitner (Yellow)
O'Driscoll (Red)
Connaughton (Blue)
Egan (Pink)
Sylvia (Purple)

Previously, names of flowers were used instead.

Extra-curricular activities

Students are encouraged to be involved in at least one club of each category.

Clubs and societies
Cultural and Dance Club
Choir Club
Road Safety Club
Crime Prevention Club
English Language Society
Home Economics Club
Interschool Christian Fellowship
SPBT club
Leo Club
Young Christian Students
Photography and Videography
Pergerakan Puteri Islam
Kelab Pelancongan (a club which is based on travelling)
Kelab Rukun Negara (National Principles Club)
Mathematics And Science Club
Kelab Nasyid dan Syarahan Agama
Environmental Club
The School's Webteam
Persatuan Pelajar Islam
Fitness Club
Kelab Pembimbing Rakan Sebaya (Counselling Services)
Librarians
Kelab Program Usahawan Muda (teaches basic entrepreneurship skills)
School's Cooperative Club
Kelab Bahasa Melayu (A club based on the Malay language)

Uniform bodies
Joyful Vanguard Movement
International Taekwondo Federation
World Taekwondo Federation
Girl Guides
Symphonic Concert Band
Red Crescent 
Police Cadet
Teen's Cadet
Firefighter's Club

Sports and games
Softball
Basketball
Bowling
Badminton
Squash
Hockey
Olahraga (Sportsmanship)
Volleyball
Petanque
Chess

Prefectorial board
The board serves to make sure that the students of the school do not break any school rules. Prefects are divided into different units (usually in a cycle every month) :
Disciplinary Unit
Assembly Unit
Class Supervision Unit
Cleanliness Unit
Safety and Surveillance Unit
Social and Welfare Unit

The councils include the Head Prefect, Assistant Head Prefect I, Assistant Head Prefect II and followed by the head of every unit.
Both sessions (morning and afternoon session) have different councils and at times have different ways of implementing the school rules. However, these prefects work together during big school events like Sports Day, Teacher's Day, school-level Independence Day Celebration and so on.

School uniforms

Regular students
Muslim students:  White baju kurung over long turquoise skirt and white shoes
Non-Muslim students: Turquoise pinafore worn over white short-sleeved shirt and white shoes or White baju kurung over long turquoise skirt and white shoes

Prefects
Muslim Prefects: Dark brown blazer worn over white long sleeved shirt with the school neck tie, long beige skirt and black shoes.
Non-Muslim Prefects: Dark brown blazer worn over white short-sleeved shirt with the school neck tie, knee-length beige skirt and black shoes.

Wednesdays
Wednesdays are declared throughout all public schools in Malaysia as "Hari Memakai Pakaian Unit Beruniform" where all students are instructed to wear their uniform bodies uniform. 
 Students without these uniforms are allowed to wear a standardized white T-shirt (differs with every club) with the school's track pants.
 School prefects are exempted.

Special events
No Plastic Bag Day- every Wednesday
60 Minutes With Books- every first Wednesday of each month
Hari Memakai Pakaian Unit Beruniform- every Wednesday

Facilities
Sick Room (clinic)
Counselling Room
School's Cooperative
Toilets
Bathrooms
Canteen
Resource Room
P.U.M Stall
Staff Room
Store Room
Surau
SPBT room
Teresian Room

References

National secondary schools in Malaysia
Secondary schools in Sarawak
Educational institutions established in 1885
1885 establishments in Sarawak